Wyoming Highway 12 (WYO 12) is a  Wyoming state highway known as Herrick Lane in Albany County west of Laramie.

Route description 
Wyoming Highway 12 travels from Wyoming Highway 130, five miles (8 km) west of Laramie near the Laramie Regional Airport west to an intersection with Albany County Route 57 (Mandel Lane) just past the junction with Interstate 80 (Exit 297). From there WYO 12 becomes Albany County Route 57 (Dutton Creek Road). Further west, CR 57 connects with I-80 again at Exit 290 (Quealy Dome) by the way of Albany CR 59 (Hunt Road), and at Exit 279 at the end of Dutton Creek Road. Mileposts along Highway 12 increase from east to west.

Major intersections

References

External links

WYO 12 - WYO 130 to I-80
WYO 12 - I-80 to Albany CR 57

Transportation in Albany County, Wyoming
012